is a Japanese animated fantasy adventure film, the 6th feature produced by Toei Animation (then Tōei Dōga), released in Japan on March 24, 1963. English-dubbed versions have been released under several titles, including The Little Prince and the Eight-Headed Dragon, Prince in Wonderland and Rainbow Bridge.

Based on the Shintō myth of the storm god Susanoo's battle with the Yamata no Orochi, the color, "ToeiScope" anamorphic format film is scripted by Ichirō Ikeda and Takashi Iijima and directed by Yūgo Serikawa. It is considered one of the very best of the Tōei Dōga features and a landmark in anime and animated features in general, placing 10th in the list of the 150 best animated films and series of all time compiled by Tokyo's Laputa Animation Festival from an international survey of animation staff and critics in 2003.

It features distinctively modernist, abstracted character, background and color design, formalised the role of supervising animator (performed on this film by Yasuji Mori) in the Japan and drew attention to the talents of animators Yasuo Ōtsuka and Yōichi Kotabe (who made his debut as a key animator on the film, though he is inaccurately credited on screen an in between artist) and assistant directors Isao Takahata and Kimio Yabuki.

The score, composed by Akira Ifukube, is also acclaimed.

Plot

The film tells the story of the deity Susanoo (as a cute boy), whose mother, Izanami, has died. He is deeply hurt by the loss of his mother but his father, Izanagi, tells him that his mother is now in heaven. Despite Izanagi's warnings, Susanoo eventually sets off to find her.

Along with his companions, Akahana (a little talking rabbit) and Titanbō (a strong but friendly giant from the Land of Fire), Susanoo overcomes all obstacles in his long voyage. He eventually comes to the Izumo Province, where he meets Princess Kushinada, a little girl whom he becomes friends with (he also thinks that she is so beautiful that she looks like his mother). Kushinada's family tells Susanoo that their other seven daughters were sacrificed to the fearsome eight-headed serpent, the Yamata no Orochi. Susanoo is so infatuated with Kushinada that he decides to help her family protect her and slay the Orochi once and for all and he, Akahana, and Bō prepare for the showdown.

Cast

 Morio Kazama as Susanoo 
 Yukiko Okada as Princess Kushinada
 Chiharu Kuri as Akahana
 Masato Yamanouchi as Wadatsumi, Kushinada-hime's father
 Kiyoshi Kawakubo as Titan-bô
 Hideo Kinoshita as Tarô / Tsukuyomi
 Kinshirô Iwao as Hi no kami (God of Fire)

Notes

This film eschewed the soft, rounded look of previous Toei animated features for a more stylized one. It is also one of the few animated films to have music by famed composer Akira Ifukube (the other being the posthumously released Tetsujin 28 film Hakuchū no Zangetsu).

A symphonic suite of five movements based on the score's cues was created by Ifukube in 2003, the first recording of which was performed by the Japan Philharmonic Orchestra conducted by Tetsuji Honna and released on Compact Disc by King Records within the same year. Some of the film's music was also redeployed in the 1st and 32nd episodes, first broadcast in 1972 and 1973 respectively, of the Toei Animation television series Mazinger Z.

The film's theme song, is also composed by Ifukube, with lyrics by Takashi Morishima, and is sung by Setsuko Watanabe.

The original, monaural soundtrack recording has been released three times on Compact Disc, two of which are now out of print. The first was a two disc set released by Futureland in 1992, which paired it with a disc of alternate takes and Ifukube's score for Mitsubishi's Expo '70 exhibit. The second release was part of a ten-disc collection of Toei Animation soundtracks released by Nippon Columbia in 1996; it featured better audio quality but lacked the alternate takes. On May 23, 2018, Japanese record label Cinema-kan released the score for a third time as a remastered, two-disc set, titled The Naughty Prince's Orochi Slaying Original Soundtrack (CINK-51-52). The first disc contains the complete score while the second disc contains alternate takes, sound effects, and trailer music. The English translated track list of the Cinema-kan release reads as follows:

Disc 1 - CINK-51 

 Main Title (M1 · M2)
 Susanoo Appears (M3)
 Lullaby for a Motherless Child I (M4 · M5)
 Izanami's Ascension (M6)
 Susanoo's Sorrow (M7 · M8)
 Lullaby for a Motherless Child II (M9 · M10)
 Departure (M11 · M12)
 Monster Fish Akuru (M13 · M14)
 Yoru-no-Osukuni (M15 · M16)
 Ice Mirror (M17 · M18 · M19)
 Susanoo's Rampage (ME137 · M20)
 Tsukuyomi and Susanoo (M21 · M21A · M21B)
 Land of Fire (M22 · M23 · M24)
 Fire God and Susanoo (M25 · M26)
 Ice Ball (M27 · M28)
 To Takama-ga-hara (M29)
 Amaterasu (M30)
 Land Reclamation (M31 · M32 · M33 · M34)
 Flood (M35)
 Ama-no-Iwato (M36)
 Omoikane's Trick (M37 · M38)
 Iwato Kagura (M39)
 Stone Door Opens (M40 · M41 · M42)
 To Izumo Province (M43 · M44)
 Kushinadahime (M45)
 Yamata-no-Orochi (M46)
 Ame-no-Hayakoma (M47)
 Susanoo and Kushinadahime (M48 · M49)
 Waiting for Orochi (M50)
 Yamata-no-Orochi Emerges (M51 · M52)
 Sake Drinking Orochi (M53)
 Susanoo Sortie (M54)
 Susanoo vs. Orochi I (M55)
 Susanoo vs. Orochi II (M56)
 Kushinadahime's Crisis (M57 · M58)
 Susanoo vs. Orochi III (M59)
 Final Battle (M60 · M61)
 Morning of Victory (M62)
 Ending (M63)

Disc 2 - CINK-52 

 Main Title (M1T1)
 Lullaby for a Motherless Child (M5) <Alternate Take Without Vocal>
 Izanami's Ascension (M6T1)
 Izanami's Ascension (M6T2)
 Izanami's Ascension (M6) <Alternate Take Without Vocal>
 Izanagi and Susanoo (M7T1)
 Vision of Izanami (M9) <Alternate Take Without Vocal>
 Susanoo's Anger (M19T1)
 To Takama-ga-hara (M29T1)
 Damming the River (M34T1)
 Flood (M35T1)
 Omoikane's Trick (M37T1 · M38T1)
 Iwato Kagura II (M40T1)
 Iwato Kagura II (M40T2)
 Leaving Takama-ga-hara (M43T1)
 Preparing for Battle (M49T1)
 Preparing for Battle (M49T2)
 Ending (M63T1)
 Ending (M63) <Alternate Take Without Vocal>
 Lullaby for a Motherless Child 1 (PS)
 Lullaby for a Motherless Child 2 (PS)
 Lullaby for a Motherless Child 3 (PS)
 Lullaby for a Motherless Child 5 (PS)
 ME Collection 1
 ME Collection 2
 SE Collection 1
 SE Collection 2
 Yamata-no-Orochi's Cry
 Trailer Music

Release

The film was distributed in the United States, under the title The Little Prince and the Eight-Headed Dragon, as a matinee feature by Columbia Pictures, opening January 1, 1964. Its Japanese origin was downplayed, as was standard practice at the time, with William Ross, the director of the English dubbing, credited as director and Fujifilm and Toei's color and widescreen processes rebranded as "MagiColor" and "WonderScope" respectively.

Though still highly regarded in animation circles, the film is now little-known outside of them. A Japanese DVD-Video was released in 2002 and reissued in limited quantity in 2008. In 2019, a cropped transfer of the English-dubbed version was released in the United States by Mill Creek Entertainment as part of the "Pop Culture Bento Box" compilation set, though early copies of the set accidentally omitted the film. On February 5, 2020, Toei released the film on Blu-ray Disc in Japan.

Reception

Accolades received by Wanpaku at the time of its release including being honoured with a Bronze Osella at the Venice Film Festival and the Ōfuji Noburō Award at the 1963 Mainichi Film Awards and making it into the official recommendations of the Japanese Ministry of Education and the Ministry of Health's Central Child Welfare Council.

Legacy

Genndy Tartakovsky watched the film and identifies it as a primary influence on the direction and design of his TV series Samurai Jack.

According to Yōichi Kotabe, a character animator on the film who later worked for Nintendo, the art direction of the Nintendo game The Legend of Zelda: The Wind Waker was likely influenced by the film. 

Tomm Moore, the director of the Oscar-nominated films The Secret of Kells, Song of the Sea, and Wolfwalkers, has identified the film as a major influence.

See also

 List of animated feature films
 List of Japanese films of 1963
 Japanese mythology

References

External links
 
 
 
 
 
 

1960s adventure films
1960s fantasy films
1963 anime films
1963 films
Adventure anime and manga
Animated adventure films
1960s children's fantasy films
Films scored by Akira Ifukube
Films based on Japanese myths and legends
Japanese animated fantasy films
Japanese mythology in anime and manga
Japanese fantasy adventure films
Toei Animation films
Films with screenplays by Ichirô Ikeda
Columbia Pictures animated films
Columbia Pictures films
Animated films about dragons
Films directed by Yûgo Serikawa
1960s American films